Edward Stanhope PC (24 September 1840 – 21 December 1893) was a British Conservative Party politician who was Secretary of State for War from 1887 to 1892.

Background and education
Born in London, Stanhope was the second son of Philip Stanhope, 5th Earl Stanhope, by his wife Emily Harriet, daughter of General Sir Edward Kerrison, 1st Baronet. Arthur Stanhope, 6th Earl Stanhope was his elder brother and Philip Stanhope, 1st Baron Weardale his younger brother. He was educated at Harrow and Christ Church, Oxford. Stanhope studied law, being called to the bar at the Inner Temple in 1865. In 1861 he played three first-class cricket matches for Kent County Cricket Club.

Political career

In 1874 Stanhope was elected to the House of Commons for Mid Lincolnshire, a seat he held until 1885, and then represented Horncastle until his death. He soon rose to a position of prominence within the party. In 1875, he became Parliamentary Secretary to the Board of Trade, and in 1878 moved up to Under-Secretary of State for India, where he was a key assistant to India Secretary Lord Cranbrook.

After the Tories' fall from power in 1880, Stanhope supported Commons leader Sir Stafford Northcote against younger Tories led by Lord Randolph Churchill in internal Conservative party squabbling. When the Conservatives returned to the power, Stanhope became vice-president of the Committee of Council on Education, with a seat in the cabinet, and almost immediately thereafter President of the Board of Trade. He moved up to major cabinet office in Salisbury's second government, serving first as Colonial Secretary from 1886 to 1887 and then as Secretary of State for War from 1887 to 1892 following a cabinet reshuffle in January 1887.

As War Secretary, Stanhope fought for reform against the reactionary high officers – most notably the Duke of Cambridge, the Commander in Chief, and Sir Garnet Wolseley, the Adjutant-General. In spite of his own inexperience in military affairs and this formidable opposition, Stanhope achieved a fair amount, although it was his Liberal successor, Henry Campbell-Bannerman, who managed to push Cambridge into retirement.

Personal life
In December 1893, Stanhope died suddenly of a heart attack, aged 53.

The school house 'Stanhope' at Alderwood School in the garrison town of Aldershot in Hampshire is named in his honour.

References

External links
 

1840 births
Conservative Party (UK) MPs for English constituencies
Members of the Privy Council of the United Kingdom
English cricketers
Kent cricketers
UK MPs 1874–1880
UK MPs 1880–1885
UK MPs 1885–1886
UK MPs 1886–1892
UK MPs 1892–1895
1893 deaths
Younger sons of earls
I Zingari cricketers
People educated at Harrow School
Alumni of Christ Church, Oxford
Members of the Inner Temple
Edward
Gentlemen of the South cricketers
Secretaries of State for the Colonies
Parliamentary Secretaries to the Board of Trade
Presidents of the Board of Trade